Kendall Donnerson (born April 22, 1996) is an American football defensive end who is a free agent. He played college football at Southeast Missouri State.

Professional career

Green Bay Packers
Donnerson was drafted by the Green Bay Packers in the seventh round (248th overall) of the 2018 NFL Draft. He signed his rookie contract on May 7, 2018. He was waived on September 1, 2018, and was signed to the practice squad the next day. He was promoted to the active roster on December 4, 2018.

On August 8, 2019, he was placed on injured reserve by the Packers. He was released on August 19.

Oakland Raiders
On October 15, 2019, Donnerson was signed to the Oakland Raiders practice squad. On December 30, 2019, Donnerson was signed to a reserve/future contract. He was waived on May 5, 2020.

Cincinnati Bengals
On September 30, 2020, Donnerson was signed to the Cincinnati Bengals practice squad. He was released on November 3.

Carolina Panthers
On May 16, 2021, Donnerson signed with the Carolina Panthers. He was waived by Carolina on May 26.

New Orleans Saints
On July 26, 2021, Donnerson signed with the New Orleans Saints. He was released on August 4, 2021.

Carolina Panthers (second stint)
On August 8, 2021, Donnerson signed with the Carolina Panthers. He was waived on August 24.

References

External links
 Southeast Missouri Redhawks bio

Living people
1996 births
American football defensive ends
American football linebackers
Carolina Panthers players
Cincinnati Bengals players
Green Bay Packers players
Las Vegas Raiders players
New Orleans Saints players
Oakland Raiders players
People from Maumelle, Arkansas
Players of American football from Arkansas
Southeast Missouri State Redhawks football players